Sulphur Springs is an unincorporated community in Buena Vista County, located in the U.S. state of Iowa.

History
Sulphur Springs' population was 55 in 1902, and 115 in 1925.

Geography
A grain elevator complex owned by a farmers' cooperative is in Sulphur Springs, located on the Canadian National Railway mainline from Chicago to Sioux City, which runs through Sulphur Springs.

See also
List of unincorporated communities in Iowa

References

Unincorporated communities in Buena Vista County, Iowa
Unincorporated communities in Iowa